Masaru Takeda (武田 勝, born July 10, 1978 in Nagoya) is a Japanese former professional baseball pitcher and current coach for the Hokkaido Nippon-Ham Fighters in Japan's Nippon Professional Baseball. He played for the Fighters from 2006 to 2016.

External links

NBP

1978 births
Japanese baseball players
Hokkaido Nippon-Ham Fighters players
Living people
Managers of baseball teams in Japan
Nippon Professional Baseball pitchers
Baseball people from Nagoya